China National Highway 329 (G329) runs from Hangzhou to Shenjiamen in Zhejiang. It is 292 kilometres in length and runs east from Hangzhou, going through Shaoxing and Ningbo.

Route and distance

See also
 China National Highways

Transport in Hangzhou
Transport in Zhejiang
329